McLeod Glacier is a glacier that descends from the Wilson Hills of Antarctica, between Stanwix Ridge and Arthurson Ridge, into Davies Bay. It was plotted by Australian cartographers from air photos taken by U.S. Navy Operation Highjump, 1946–47, and was named by the Antarctic Names Committee of Australia for geologist Ian R. McLeod, leader of an airborne field party that visited this area with the Australian National Antarctic Research Expedition (Magga Dan) in 1961.

References

Glaciers of Oates Land